Defending champions Serena and Venus Williams defeated Samantha Stosur and Rennae Stubbs in the final, 7–6(7–4), 6–4 to win the ladies' doubles tennis title at the 2009 Wimbledon Championships. It was their fourth Wimbledon title together and ninth major title together overall. As in the previous year, the Williams sisters won the title without losing a set during the tournament. Also as in the previous year, the two contested the singles final as well, with Serena emerging victorious. It was also the first component in an eventual non-calendar-year Grand Slam for the sisters.

Seeds

  Cara Black /  Liezel Huber (semifinals)
  Anabel Medina Garrigues /  Virginia Ruano Pascual (semifinals)
  Samantha Stosur /  Rennae Stubbs (final)
  Serena Williams /  Venus Williams (champions)
  Hsieh Su-wei /  Peng Shuai (first round)
  Daniela Hantuchová /  Ai Sugiyama (second round)
  Victoria Azarenka /  Elena Vesnina (third round, withdrew due to heat illness)
  Maria Kirilenko /  Flavia Pennetta (first round)
  Lisa Raymond /  Vera Zvonareva (first round)
  Bethanie Mattek-Sands /  Nadia Petrova (third round)
  Nuria Llagostera Vives  /  María José Martínez Sánchez (quarterfinals)
  Anna-Lena Grönefeld /  Vania King (quarterfinals)
  Yan Zi /  Zheng Jie (third round)
  Nathalie Dechy /  Mara Santangelo (first round)
  Chuang Chia-jung /  Sania Mirza (second round)
  Svetlana Kuznetsova /  Amélie Mauresmo (third round)

Qualifying

Draw

Finals

Top half

Section 1

Section 2

Bottom half

Section 3

Section 4

References

External links

2009 Wimbledon Championships on WTAtennis.com
2009 Wimbledon Championships – Women's draws and results at the International Tennis Federation

Women's Doubles
Wimbledon Championship by year – Women's doubles
Wimbledon Championships
Wimbledon Championships